Textual variants in the Book of Genesis concerns textual variants in the Hebrew Bible found in the Book of Genesis.

Legend

List 

This list provides examples of known textual variants, and contains the following parameters: Hebrew texts written right to left, the Hebrew text romanised left to right, an approximate English translation, and which Hebrew manuscripts or critical editions of the Hebrew Bible this textual variant can be found in. Greek (Septuagint) and Latin (Vulgate) texts are written left to right, and not romanised. Sometimes additional translation or interpretation notes are added, with references to similar verses elsewhere, or in-depth articles on the topic in question.
 Genesis 1 
Genesis 1:1, see also In the beginning (phrase)
  – MT 4QGen (4QGen) SP
  – 4QGen
  – LXX LXX ABP
  – Vg

Genesis 1:1, see also Elohim and Names of God in Judaism § Elohim
  ('[the] gods' or 'God') – MT (4QGen) 4QGen SP.
  – ABP
  – Vg

Genesis 1:1, see also Heaven in Judaism
  – MT 4QGen SP
  – LXX ABP
  – Vg

Genesis 1:2, see also 
  – MT (4QGen) SP
  – LXX ABP
  – Vg

Genesis 1:7
  – MT (4QGen) 4QGen SP Damascus Pent. Codex
  – LXX ABP
  – Vg

Genesis 1:7
  – MT 4QGen 4QGen SP Damascus Pent. Codex
  – Vg
 omitted – LXX ABP

Genesis 1:9
  – MT 4QGen Damascus Pent. Codex SP.
  – 4QGen. A  is a ritual bath in modern Judaism.
  – LXX ABP.

Genesis 1:9
  – LXX ABP. Compare Book of Jubilees 2:6.
 omitted – 4QGen MT SP Damascus Pent. Codex Vg

 Genesis 2 
Genesis 2:4, see also toledot
  – MT
  – SP Kennicott
  – LXX ABP
  – Vg

Genesis 2:4
  – MT SP
  – LXX ABP
  – LXX
  – Vg

Genesis 2:4
  – MT
  – SP
  – LXX LXX ABP
  – Vg

Genesis 2:5
  – MT SP
  – LXX LXX
  – ABP
  – Vg

Genesis 2:7, see also Soul in the Bible § Genesis 2:7
  – MT SP.
  – LXX
  – ABP
  – Vg

Genesis 2:8
  – MT SP
  – ABP
  – LXX 
  – LXX
  – Vg

Genesis 2:8, see also Garden of Eden
 
  – LXX
  – ABP
  – Vg

Genesis 2:9
  – MT SP
  – LXX LXX ABP
  – Vg

Genesis 2:9
 omitted – MT
  – SP

Genesis 2:13
  – MT
  –  LXX ABP
  – Vg
 See also Cush (Bible), Rivers of Paradise, and Gihon.

Genesis 2:16, see also Adam
  – WLC
  – LXX LXX ABP
  – Vg
Compare Genesis 2:18

Genesis 2:17, see also tree of the knowledge of good and evil
  – WLC
  – LXX
  – ABP
  – Vg

Genesis 2:18, see also Adam
  – WLC
  – LXX LXX ABP
  – Vg
Compare Genesis 2:16

Genesis 2:18, see also Eve
  – WLC
  – LXX LXX ABP
  – Vg

Genesis 2:23, see also Eve
  – WLC
  – LXX ABP
  –  LXX
  – Vg

Genesis 2:23, see also Eve
  – LXX LXX (Koine Greek spelling)
  – ABP (classical Greek spelling)

Genesis 2:24, see also Eve
  – WLC
  – LXX LXX 
  – ABP
  – Vg

Genesis 2:25
  – Vg
 omitted – WLC LXX LXX ABP

 Genesis 3 
Genesis 3:20, see also Eve
  – WLC
  – LXX  
  – LXX ABP
  – Vg
Compare Genesis 4:1

 Genesis 4 
Genesis 4:1, see also Eve, and Cain and Abel
  – WLC
  – LXX 
  – LXX ABP
  – Vg
Compare Genesis 3:20

Genesis 4:1
  – WLC
  – LXX LXX ABP
  – Vg

Genesis 4:9
  – WLC
  – LXX LXX 
  – ABP
  – Vg

Genesis 4:10
  – LXX LXX 
  – ABP
 omitted – WLC Vg

Genesis 4:12, see also Curse and mark of Cain
  – WLC
  – LXX LXX ABP
  – Vg
Compare Genesis 4:14

Genesis 4:13, see also Curse and mark of Cain
  – WLC
  – LXX LXX ABP
  – Vg

Genesis 4:14, see also Curse and mark of Cain
  – WLC
  – LXX LXX ABP
  – Vg
Compare Genesis 4:12

Genesis 4:15
  – WLC
  – LXX LXX ABP
  – Vg

Genesis 4:15, see also Curse and mark of Cain
  – WLC
  – LXX LXX ABP
 The English verb "to paralyse" derives from the Greek verb παραλύω ("to loosen from the side, relax, enfeeble, weaken, disable, paralyse").
  – Vg

Genesis 4:16
  – WLC
  – LXX LXX ABP
  – Vg

Genesis 4:16, see also Land of Nod
  – WLC
 H6925  qidmah can mean both "east" and "over against" or "in front of".
  – LXX LXX
  – ABP
  – Vg

Genesis 4:18, see also Enoch (son of Cain), and Generations of Adam
  – WLC
  – LXX LXX ABP
  – Vg
Compare Genesis 5:6–26

Genesis 4:20
  – WLC
  – LXX LXX ABP
  – Vg

 Genesis 5 
Genesis 5:1, see also Generations of Adam and Toledot
  – WLC
  – LXX LXX ABP
  – Vg

Genesis 5:2
  – WLC
  – LXX LXX ABP
  – Vg

Genesis 5:6–26, see also Generations of Adam
  – WLC
  – LXX LXX ABP
  – Vg
Compare Genesis 4:18

 Genesis 6 
Genesis 6:6, see also Genesis flood narrative
  – WLC
  – LXX LXX ABP
  – Vg

Genesis 6:6, see also Genesis flood narrative
  – WLC
  – LXX LXX ABP
  – Vg

Genesis 6:7, see also Genesis flood narrative
  – WLC
  – LXX LXX ABP
  – Vg

Genesis 6:14, see also Noah's Ark
  – WLC
  – LXX LXX ABP
  – Vg
 In other contexts, each of the Hebrew, Greek and Latin words are used to describe a (wooden) box, basket or chest for storage. The traditionally used English word ark derives from the Latin word arca (from the verb arceō, "to keep off/away/close"), which outside of the Bible never refers to any kind of ship, but always a relatively small object for keeping items. The same nouns are used for the Ark of the Covenant. The Hebrew noun H1613  gopher is a hapax legomenon.

 Genesis 9 
Genesis 9:20, see also Curse of Ham
  – WLC
  – LXX LXX ABP
  – Vg

 Genesis 15 
Genesis 15:17
  – WLC
  LXX Brenton ABP
  – Vg

 Genesis 34 

Genesis 34:2
  – WLC
  – A LXX 
  – Brenton ABP
  – Vg

Genesis 34:2, see also Rape in the Hebrew Bible § Genesis 34 § Linguistic analysis
  – WLC
  LXX Brenton ABP
  – Vg

Genesis 34:3, see also Rape in the Hebrew Bible § Genesis 34 § Linguistic analysis
  – WLC
  LXX
  Brenton ABP
  – Vg

Genesis 34:3 (twice)
  [H5288] – MT
  [H5291] – SP
  – LXX Brenton ABP
 omitted – Vg

Genesis 34:3
  [H5921] – MT
  [H413] – SP
  – LXX Brenton ABP
 omitted – Vg

Genesis 34:7, see also Rape in the Hebrew Bible § Genesis 34 § Historical-ethical analysis
  – WLC
  LXX Brenton ABP
  – Vg

Genesis 34:9, see also Rape in the Hebrew Bible § Genesis 34 § Historical-ethical analysis
  – WLC
  – LXX Brenton ABP
  – Vg

Genesis 34:11
  – WLC
  – LXX
  – Brenton ABP
  – Vg

Genesis 34:14
  – WLC
  – LXX
  – Brenton ABP
 omitted – Vg

Genesis 34:14, see also Rape in the Hebrew Bible § Genesis 34 § Historical-ethical analysis
  – WLC
  – LXX Brenton ABP
  – Vg

 Genesis 49 
Genesis 49:4
 ) – WLC
  – LXX
  – ABP
  – Vg Vg
 Compare Leviticus 18:22; Leviticus 20:13. See also Bilhah and Reuben (son of Jacob).

See also 
 List of Hebrew Bible manuscripts

References

Bibliography 
 
 
 
 
  (E-book edition)
 
 Emanuel Tov, The Text-Critical Use of the Septuagint in Biblical Research (TCU), 1981 (1st edition), 1997 (2nd edition), 2015 (3rd edition).
 Emanuel Tov, Textual Criticism of the Hebrew Bible (TCHB), 1992 (1st edition), 2001 (2nd edition), 2012 (3rd edition).
 Emanuel Tov, Textual Criticism of the Hebrew Bible, Qumran, Septuagint: Collected Writings, Volume 3 (2015).

External links 
 Digitized Hebrew and Greek Manuscripts: Access and Issues – Introduction to online biblical textual studies

Biblical criticism
Early versions of the Bible
Book of Genesis
Hebrew Bible versions and translations
Jewish manuscripts
Old Testament-related lists
Septuagint manuscripts
Textual criticism